St. John the Baptist Ukrainian Catholic Church is a Ukrainian Catholic parish in the South Side Flats neighborhood of Pittsburgh, Pennsylvania under the authority of the Eparchy of St. Josaphat in Parma, Ohio.

The parish was established in 1891. Its historic church building, located at 109 South Carson Street in Pittsburgh, Pennsylvania, was built in 1895 and added to the National Register of Historic Places in 1974.

References

External links

Church web site

Churches on the National Register of Historic Places in Pennsylvania
Churches completed in 1895
19th-century churches in the United States
Churches in Pittsburgh
Eastern Catholic churches in Pennsylvania
Ukrainian Catholic churches in the United States
Ukrainian-American culture in Pennsylvania
Pittsburgh History & Landmarks Foundation Historic Landmarks
National Register of Historic Places in Pittsburgh